John Edward Macerelli (November 2, 1930 - October 12, 1984) was an offensive tackle and offensive guard who played one season for the Cleveland Browns in 1956.

References

1930 births
1984 deaths
American football offensive tackles
Saint Vincent Bearcats football players
Cleveland Browns players
Players of American football from Pennsylvania
People from Washington County, Pennsylvania